Luís Paquete (6 May 1940 – January 2003) was a Portuguese weightlifter. He competed at the 1960 Summer Olympics and the 1968 Summer Olympics.

References

External links
 

1940 births
2003 deaths
Portuguese male weightlifters
Olympic weightlifters of Portugal
Weightlifters at the 1960 Summer Olympics
Weightlifters at the 1968 Summer Olympics
People from Évora
Sportspeople from Évora District